Marco Polo Cycling–Donckers Koffie (UCI Code: MPC) was a UCI Continental cycling team, registered in Ethiopia. The team is named after traveller Marco Polo, and has title sponsorship from Belgian coffee company Donckers Koffie.

History 
The idea of the team came in 1998 and in 2001 the team was registered in Hong Kong. In 2003 it became a UCI Continental team and from 2005 the team was registered in China becoming the first professional cycling team from China.

Li Fuyu rode with the team for two years from 2005 before joining the Discovery Channel team. This led to a partnership between the teams, resulting in the 2007 Discovery Channel Marco Polo team. In 2008, Trek became the sponsor and the name became Trek-Marco Polo. The team has a house in the Netherlands for riders.

After a ten-year run the team did not have a sponsor for 2013 season.

Major wins 

2003
Stage 1 & 5, Tour de Korea, Wong Kam-po
 Mongolia, Road Race Championship, Jamsran Ulzii-Orshikh
 Mongolia, Time Trial Championship, Jamsran Ulzii-Orshikh
Stage 1 Tour of Qinghai Lake, Wong Kam-po
Overall Tour du Faso, Maarten Tjallingii
Stage 1, Maarten Tjallingii
Stage 2 & 10, Kay Kermer
Stage 6a Tour of Southland, Robin Reid
2004
Stage 5 UAE Emirates Post Tour, Robin Reid
Overall Tour de Korea, Cory Lange
Stage 7 Tour of Southland, Robin Reid
2005
Stage 5 Tour of Siam, Edmunds Hollands
 Mongolia, Road Race Championship, Jamsran Ulzii-Orshikh
 Mongolia, Time Trial Championship, Jamsran Ulzii-Orshikh
 New Zealand, Time Trial Championship, Robin Reid
2006
Overall Tour of Siam, Thomas Rabou
Stage 5, Jamsran Ulzii-Orshikh
Overall Tour of Thailand, Li Fuyu
Stage 3, Li Fuyu
 Mongolia, Road Race Championship, Jamsran Ulzii-Orshikh
 Mongolia, Time Trial Championship, Jamsran Ulzii-Orshikh
Stage 2 & 8 Tour d'Indonesia, Serguei Kudentsov
Stage 6 Tour d'Indonesia, Jamsran Ulzii-Orshikh 
2007
 Mongolia, Road Race Championship, Jamsran Ulzii-Orshikh
Stage 6 Tour de Korea, Serguei Kudentsov
Stage 1 & 4 Tour of Hainan, Serguei Kudentsov
2008
Stage 1 Jelajah Malaysia, Li Fuyu
Stage 3 Tour de Kumano, Léon van Bon
Stage 3 Tour of Thailand, Loh Sea Keong
Stage 6 Tour of Thailand, Léon van Bon
Stage 5 & 6 Tour of South China Sea, Serguei Kudentsov
2009
 South Africa, Time Trial Championship, Jaco Venter
Stage 5 Tour of Thailand, James Spragg
Stage 8 Tour de Korea, Léon van Bon
, Time Trial Championship, Li Fuyu

National champions
2003
 Mongolia, Road Race Championship, Jamsran Ulzii-Orshikh
 Mongolia, Time Trial Championship, Jamsran Ulzii-Orshikh
2005
 Mongolia, Road Race Championship, Jamsran Ulzii-Orshikh
 Mongolia, Time Trial Championship, Jamsran Ulzii-Orshikh
 New Zealand, Time Trial Championship, Robin Reid
2006
 Mongolia, Road Race Championship, Jamsran Ulzii-Orshikh
 Mongolia, Time Trial Championship, Jamsran Ulzii-Orshikh
2007
 Mongolia, Road Race Championship, Jamsran Ulzii-Orshikh
2009
 South Africa, Time Trial Championship, Jaco Venter
, Time Trial Championship, Li Fuyu

2012 team 
As of 23 February 2012.

References

External links
Official Website
Diaries of the team on Cyclingnews

UCI Continental Teams (Asia)
Cycling teams based in China
Cycling teams established in 2001
UCI Continental Teams (Africa)
Defunct cycling teams
Cycling teams disestablished in 2012
Cycling teams based in Ethiopia
Cycling teams based in Hong Kong